The list of security hacking incidents covers important or noteworthy events in the history of security hacking and cracking.

1900

1903

 Magician and inventor Nevil Maskelyne disrupts John Ambrose Fleming's public demonstration of Guglielmo Marconi's purportedly secure wireless telegraphy technology, sending insulting Morse code messages through the auditorium's projector.

1930s

1932
 Polish cryptologists Marian Rejewski, Henryk Zygalski and Jerzy Różycki broke the Enigma machine code.

1939
 Alan Turing, Gordon Welchman and Harold Keen worked together to develop the Bombe (on the basis of Rejewski's works on Bomba). The Enigma machine's use of a reliably small key space makes it vulnerable to brute force.

1940s

1943
 René Carmille, comptroller general of the Vichy French Army, hacked the punched card system used by the Nazis to locate Jews.

1949 

The theory that underlies computer viruses was first made public in 1949, when computer pioneer John von Neumann presented a paper titled "Theory and Organization of Complicated Automata". In the paper von Neumann speculated that computer programs could reproduce themselves.

1950s

1955
 At MIT, "hack" first came to mean fussing with machines. The minutes of an April 1955 meeting of the Tech Model Railroad Club state that "Mr. Eccles requests that anyone working or hacking on the electrical system turn the power off to avoid fuse blowing."

1957
 Joe "Joybubbles" Engressia, a blind seven-year-old boy with perfect pitch, discovered that whistling the fourth E above middle C (a frequency of 2600 Hz) would interfere with AT&T's automated telephone systems, thereby inadvertently opening the door for phreaking.

1960s
 Various phreaking boxes are used to interact with automated telephone systems.

1963
 The first ever reference to malicious hacking is 'telephone hackers' in MIT's student newspaper, The Tech of hackers tying up the lines with Harvard, configuring the PDP-1 to make free calls, war dialing and accumulating large phone bills.

1965
 William D. Mathews from MIT found a vulnerability in a CTSS running on an IBM 7094. The standard text editor on the system was designed to be used by one user at a time, working in one directory, and so created a temporary file with a constant name for all instantiations of the editor. The flaw was discovered when two system programmers were editing at the same time and the temporary files for the message-of-the day and the password file became swapped, causing the contents of the system CTSS password file to display to any user logging into the system.

1967

 The first known incidence of network penetration hacking took place when members of a computer club at a suburban Chicago area high school were provided access to IBM's APL network. In the Fall of 1967, IBM (through Science Research Associates) approached Evanston Township High School with the offer of four 2741 Selectric teletypewriter based terminals with dial-up modem connectivity to an experimental computer system which implemented an early version of the APL programming language. The APL network system was structured in Workspaces which were assigned to various clients using the system. Working independently, the students quickly learned the language and the system. They were free to explore the system, often using existing code available in public Workspaces as models for their own creations. Eventually, curiosity drove the students to explore the system's wider context. This first informal network penetration effort was later acknowledged as helping harden the security of one of the first publicly accessible networks:

1970s

1971
 John T. Draper (later nicknamed Captain Crunch), his friend Joe Engressia (also known as Joybubbles), and blue box phone phreaking hit the news with an Esquire magazine feature story.

1979
 Kevin Mitnick breaks into his first major computer system, the Ark, the computer system Digital Equipment Corporation (DEC) used for developing their RSTS/E operating system software.

1980s

1980
 The FBI investigates a breach of security at National CSS (NCSS). The New York Times, reporting on the incident in 1981, describes hackers as

The newspaper describes white hat activities as part of a "mischievous but perversely positive 'hacker' tradition". When a National CSS employee revealed the existence of his password cracker, which he had used on customer accounts, the company chastised him not for writing the software but for not disclosing it sooner. The letter of reprimand stated that "The Company realizes the benefit to NCSS and in fact encourages the efforts of employees to identify security weaknesses to the VP, the directory, and other sensitive software in files".

1981
 Chaos Computer Club forms in Germany.
 Ian Murphy aka Captain Zap, was the first cracker to be tried and convicted as a felon. Murphy broke into AT&T's computers in 1981 and changed the internal clocks that metered billing rates. People were getting late-night discount rates when they called at midday. Of course, the bargain-seekers who waited until midnight to call long distance were hit with high bills.

1983
The 414s break into 60 computer systems at institutions ranging from the Los Alamos National Laboratory to Manhattan's Memorial Sloan-Kettering Cancer Center. The incident appeared as the cover story of Newsweek with the title "Beware: Hackers at play". As a result, the U.S. House of Representatives held hearings on computer security and passed several laws.
 The group KILOBAUD is formed in February, kicking off a series of other hacker groups which form soon after.
 The movie WarGames introduces the wider public to the phenomenon of hacking and creates a degree of mass paranoia of hackers and their supposed abilities to bring the world to a screeching halt by launching nuclear ICBMs.
 The U.S. House of Representatives begins hearings on computer security hacking.
 In his Turing Award lecture, Ken Thompson mentions "hacking" and describes a security exploit that he calls a "Trojan horse".

1984
 Someone calling himself Lex Luthor founds the Legion of Doom. Named after a Saturday morning cartoon, the LOD had the reputation of attracting "the best of the best"—until one of the most talented members called Phiber Optik feuded with Legion of Doomer Erik Bloodaxe and got 'tossed out of the clubhouse'. Phiber's friends formed a rival group, the Masters of Deception.
 The Comprehensive Crime Control Act gives the Secret Service jurisdiction over computer fraud.
 Cult of the Dead Cow forms in Lubbock, Texas, and begins publishing its ezine.
 The hacker magazine 2600 begins regular publication, right when TAP was putting out its final issue. The editor of 2600, "Emmanuel Goldstein" (whose real name is Eric Corley), takes his handle from the leader of the resistance in George Orwell's 1984. The publication provides tips for would-be hackers and phone phreaks, as well as commentary on the hacker issues of the day. Today, copies of 2600 are sold at most large retail bookstores.
 The Chaos Communication Congress, the annual European hacker conference organized by the Chaos Computer Club, is held in Hamburg, Germany.
 William Gibson's groundbreaking science fiction novel Neuromancer, about "Case", a futuristic computer hacker, is published. Considered the first major cyberpunk novel, it brought into hacker jargon such terms as "cyberspace", "the matrix", "simstim", and "ICE".

1985
 KILOBAUD is re-organized into The P.H.I.R.M. and begins sysopping hundreds of BBSs throughout the United States, Canada, and Europe.
 The online 'zine Phrack is established.
 The Hacker's Handbook is published in the UK.
 The FBI, Secret Service, Middlesex County NJ Prosecutor's Office and various local law enforcement agencies execute seven search warrants concurrently across New Jersey on July 12, 1985, seizing equipment from BBS operators and users alike for "complicity in computer theft", under a newly passed, and yet untested criminal statute. This is famously known as the Private Sector Bust, or the 2600 BBS Seizure, and implicated the Private Sector BBS sysop, Store Manager (also a BBS sysop), Beowulf, Red Barchetta, The Vampire, the NJ Hack Shack BBS sysop, and the Treasure Chest BBS sysop.

1986
 After more and more break-ins to government and corporate computers, Congress passes the Computer Fraud and Abuse Act, which makes it a crime to break into computer systems. The law, however, does not cover juveniles.
 Robert Schifreen and Stephen Gold are convicted of accessing the Telecom Gold account belonging to the Duke of Edinburgh under the Forgery and Counterfeiting Act 1981 in the United Kingdom, the first conviction for illegally accessing a computer system. On appeal, the conviction is overturned as hacking is not within the legal definition of forgery.
 Arrest of a hacker who calls himself The Mentor. He published a now-famous treatise shortly after his arrest that came to be known as the Hacker Manifesto in the e-zine Phrack. This still serves as the most famous piece of hacker literature and is frequently used to illustrate the mindset of hackers.
 Astronomer Clifford Stoll plays a pivotal role in tracking down hacker Markus Hess, events later covered in Stoll's 1990 book The Cuckoo's Egg.

1987
 The Christmas Tree EXEC "worm" causes major disruption to the VNET, BITNET and EARN networks.

1988
 The Morris Worm. Graduate student Robert T. Morris, Jr. of Cornell University launches a worm on the government's ARPAnet (precursor to the Internet). The worm spreads to 6,000 networked computers, clogging government and university systems. Robert Morris is dismissed from Cornell, sentenced to three years' probation, and fined $10,000.
 First National Bank of Chicago is the victim of $70 million computer theft.
 The Computer Emergency Response Team (CERT) is created by DARPA to address network security.
 The Father Christmas (computer worm) spreads over DECnet networks.

1989
 Jude Milhon (aka St Jude) and R. U. Sirius launch MONDO 2000, a major '90s tech-lifestyle magazine, in Berkeley, California.
 The politically motivated WANK worm spreads over DECnet.
 Dutch magazine Hack-Tic begins.
 The Cuckoo's Egg by Clifford Stoll is published.
 The detection of AIDS (Trojan horse) is the first instance of a ransomware detection.

1990s

1990
 Operation Sundevil introduced. After a prolonged sting investigation, Secret Service agents swoop down on organizers and prominent members of BBSs in 14 U.S. cities including the Legion of Doom, conducting early-morning raids and arrests. The arrests involve and are aimed at cracking down on credit-card theft and telephone and wire fraud. The result is a breakdown in the hacking community, with members informing on each other in exchange for immunity. The offices of Steve Jackson Games are also raided, and the role-playing sourcebook GURPS Cyberpunk is confiscated, possibly because the government fears it is a "handbook for computer crime". Legal battles arise that prompt the formation of the Electronic Frontier Foundation, including the trial of Knight Lightning.
 Australian federal police tracking Realm members Phoenix, Electron and Nom are the first in the world to use a remote data intercept to gain evidence for a computer crime prosecution.
 The Computer Misuse Act 1990 is passed in the United Kingdom, criminalising any unauthorised access to computer systems.

1992
 Release of the movie Sneakers, in which security experts are blackmailed into stealing a universal decoder for encryption systems.
 One of the first ISPs, MindVox, opens to the public.
 Bulgarian virus writer Dark Avenger wrote 1260, the first known use of polymorphic code, used to circumvent the type of pattern recognition used by antivirus software, and nowadays also intrusion detection systems.
 Publication of a hacking instruction manual for penetrating TRW credit reporting agency by Infinite Possibilities Society (IPS) gets Dr. Ripco, the sysop of Ripco BBS mentioned in the IPS manual, arrested by the United States Secret Service.

1993
 The first DEF CON hacking conference takes place in Las Vegas. The conference is meant to be a one-time party to say good-bye to BBSs (now replaced by the Web), but the gathering was so popular it became an annual event.
 AOL gives its users access to Usenet, precipitating Eternal September.

1994
 Summer: Russian crackers siphon $10 million from Citibank and transfer the money to bank accounts around the world. Vladimir Levin, the 30-year-old ringleader, used his work laptop after hours to transfer the funds to accounts in Finland and Israel. Levin stands trial in the United States and is sentenced to three years in prison. Authorities recover all but $400,000 of the stolen money.
 Hackers adapt to emergence of the World Wide Web quickly, moving all their how-to information and hacking programs from the old BBSs to new hacker web sites.
 AOHell is released, a freeware application that allows a burgeoning community of unskilled script kiddies to wreak havoc on America Online. For days, hundreds of thousands of AOL users find their mailboxes flooded with multi-megabyte email bombs and their chat rooms disrupted with spam messages.
 December 27: After experiencing an IP spoofing attack by Kevin Mitnick, computer security expert Tsutomu Shimomura started to receive prank calls that popularized the phrase "My kung fu is stronger than yours".

1995
 The movies The Net and Hackers are released.
 The Canadian ISP dlcwest.com is hacked and website replaced with a graphic and the caption "You've been hacked MOFO"
 The US Secret Service raid 12 and arrest 6 cellular phone hackers in Operation Cybersnare
 February 22: The FBI raids the "Phone Masters".

1996
 Hackers alter Web sites of the United States Department of Justice (August), the CIA (October), and the U.S. Air Force (December).
 Canadian hacker group, Brotherhood, breaks into the Canadian Broadcasting Corporation.
 Arizona hacker, John Sabo A.K.A FizzleB/Peanut, was arrested for hacking Canadian ISP dlcwest.com claiming the company was defrauding customers through over billing.
 The US general accounting office reports that hackers attempted to break into Defense Department computer files some 250,000 times in 1995 alone with a success rate of about 65% and doubling annually.
 Cryptovirology is born with the invention of the cryptoviral extortion protocol that would later form the basis of modern ransomware.

1997
 A 16-year-old Croatian youth penetrates computers at a U.S. Air Force base in Guam.
 June: Eligible Receiver 97 tests the American government's readiness against cyberattacks.
 December: Information Security publishes first issue.
 First high-profile attacks on Microsoft's Windows NT operating system

1998
 January: Yahoo! notifies Internet users that anyone visiting its site in the past month might have downloaded a logic bomb and worm planted by hackers claiming a "logic bomb" will go off if computer hacker Kevin Mitnick is not released from prison.
 February: The Internet Software Consortium proposes the use of DNSSEC (Domain Name System Security Extensions) to secure DNS servers.
 May 19: The seven members of the hacker think tank known as L0pht testify in front of the US congressional Government Affairs committee on "Weak Computer Security in Government".
 June: Information Security publishes its first annual Industry Survey, finding that nearly three-quarters of organizations suffered a security incident in the previous year.
 September: Electronic Disturbance Theater, an online political performance-art group, attacks the websites of The Pentagon, Mexican president Ernesto Zedillo, and the Frankfurt Stock Exchange, calling it conceptual art and claiming it to be a protest against the suppression of the Zapatista Army of National Liberation in southern Mexico. EDT uses the FloodNet software to bombard its opponents with access requests.
 October: "U.S. Attorney General Janet Reno announces National Infrastructure Protection Center."

1999
 Software security goes mainstream In the wake of Microsoft's Windows 98 release, 1999 becomes a banner year for security (and hacking). Hundreds of advisories and patches are released in response to newfound (and widely publicized) bugs in Windows and other commercial software products. A host of security software vendors release anti-hacking products for use on home computers.
 U.S. President Bill Clinton announces a $1.46 billion initiative to improve government computer security. The plan would establish a network of intrusion detection monitors for certain federal agencies and encourage the private sector to do the same.
 January 7: The "Legion of the Underground" (LoU) declares "war" against the governments of Iraq and the People's Republic of China. An international coalition of hackers (including Cult of the Dead Cow, 2600s staff, Phracks staff, L0pht, and the Chaos Computer Club) issued a joint statement (CRD 990107 - Hackers on planet earth against infowar) condemning the LoU's declaration of war. The LoU responded by withdrawing its declaration.
 March: The Melissa worm is released and quickly becomes the most costly malware outbreak to date.
 July: Cult of the Dead Cow releases Back Orifice 2000 at DEF CON.
 August: Kevin Mitnick, is sentenced to 5 years, of which over 4 years had already been spent pre-trial including 8 months' solitary confinement.
 September: Level Seven Crew hacks the U.S. Embassy in China's website and places racist, anti-government slogans on embassy site in regards to 1998 U.S. embassy bombings.
 September 16: The United States Department of Justice sentences the "Phone Masters".
 October: American Express introduces the "Blue" smart card, the industry's first chip-based credit card in the US.
 November 17: A hacker interviewed by Hilly Rose during the radio show Coast to Coast AM (then hosted by Art Bell) exposes a plot by al-Qaeda to derail Amtrak trains. This results in all trains being forcibly stopped over Y2K as a safety measure.

2000s

2000
 May: The ILOVEYOU worm, also known as VBS/Loveletter and Love Bug worm, is a computer worm written in VBScript. It infected millions of computers worldwide within a few hours of its release. It is considered to be one of the most damaging worms ever. It originated in the Philippines; made by an AMA Computer College student Onel de Guzman for his thesis.
 September: Computer hacker Jonathan James became the first juvenile to serve jail time for hacking.

2001
 Microsoft becomes the prominent victim of a new type of hack that attacks the domain name server. In these denial-of-service attacks, the DNS paths that take users to Microsoft's websites are corrupted.
 February: A Dutch cracker releases the Anna Kournikova virus, initiating a wave of viruses that tempts users to open the infected attachment by promising a sexy picture of the Russian tennis star.
 April: FBI agents trick two Russian crackers into coming to the U.S. and revealing how they were hacking U.S. banks.
 July: Russian programmer Dmitry Sklyarov is arrested at the annual DEF CON hacker convention. He was the first person criminally charged with violating the Digital Millennium Copyright Act (DMCA).
 August: Code Red worm, infects tens of thousands of machines.
 The National Cyber Security Alliance (NCSA) is established in response to the September 11 attacks on the World Trade Center.

2002
 January: Bill Gates decrees that Microsoft will secure its products and services, and kicks off a massive internal training and quality control campaign.
 March: Gary McKinnon is arrested following unauthorized access to US military and NASA computers.
 May: Klez.H, a variant of the worm discovered in November 2001, becomes the biggest malware outbreak in terms of machines infected, but causes little monetary damage.
 June: The Bush administration files a bill to create the Department of Homeland Security, which, among other things, will be responsible for protecting the nation's critical IT infrastructure.
 August: Researcher Chris Paget publishes a paper describing "shatter attacks", detailing how Windows' unauthenticated messaging system can be used to take over a machine. The paper raises questions about how securable Windows could ever be. It is however largely derided as irrelevant as the vulnerabilities it described are caused by vulnerable applications (placing windows on the desktop with inappropriate privileges) rather than an inherent flaw within the Operating System.
 October: The International Information Systems Security Certification Consortium—(ISC)²—confers its 10,000th CISSP certification.

2003
 The hacktivist group Anonymous was formed.
 March: Cult of the Dead Cow and Hacktivismo are given permission by the United States Department of Commerce to export software utilizing strong encryption.

2004
 March: New Zealand's Government (National Party) website defaced by hacktivist group BlackMask
 July: North Korea claims to have trained 500 hackers who successfully crack South Korean, Japanese, and their allies' computer systems.
 October: National Cyber Security Awareness Month was launched by the National Cyber Security Alliance and U.S. Department of Homeland Security.

2005
 April 2: Rafael Núñez (aka RaFa), a notorious member of the hacking group World of Hell, is arrested following his arrival at Miami International Airport for breaking into the Defense Information Systems Agency computer system in June 2001.
 September 13: Cameron Lacroix is sentenced to 11 months for gaining access to T-Mobile's network and exploiting Paris Hilton's Sidekick.
 November 3: Jeanson James Ancheta, whom prosecutors say was a member of the "Botmaster Underground", a group of script kiddies mostly noted for their excessive use of bot attacks and propagating vast amounts of spam, was taken into custody after being lured to FBI offices in Los Angeles.

2006
 January: One of the few worms to take after the old form of malware, destruction of data rather than the accumulation of zombie networks to launch attacks from, is discovered. It had various names, including Kama Sutra (used by most media reports), Black Worm, Mywife, Blackmal, Nyxem version D, Kapser, KillAV, Grew and CME-24. The worm would spread through e-mail client address books, and would search for documents and fill them with garbage, instead of deleting them to confuse the user. It would also hit a web page counter when it took control, allowing the programmer who created it as well as the world to track the progress of the worm. It would replace documents with random garbage on the third of every month. It was hyped by the media but actually affected relatively few computers, and was not a real threat for most users.
 May: Jeanson James Ancheta receives a 57-month prison sentence, and is ordered to pay damages amounting to $15,000 to the Naval Air Warfare Center in China Lake and the Defense Information Systems Agency, for damage done due to DDoS attacks and hacking. Ancheta also had to forfeit his gains to the government, which include $60,000 in cash, a BMW, and computer equipment.
 May: The largest defacement in Web History as of that time is performed by the Turkish hacker iSKORPiTX who successfully hacked 21,549 websites in one shot.
 July: Robert Moore and Edwin Pena were the first people to be charged by U.S. authorities for VoIP hacking. Robert Moore served 2 years in federal prison and was given $152,000 restitution. Once Edwin Pena was caught after fleeing the country, evading authorities for almost 2 years, he was sentenced to 10 years and given $1 million restitution.
 September: Viodentia releases FairUse4WM tool which would remove DRM information off Windows Media Audio (WMA) files downloaded from music services such as Yahoo! Unlimited, Napster, Rhapsody Music and Urge.

2007
 May 17: Estonia recovers from massive denial-of-service attack
 June 13: FBI Operation Bot Roast finds over 1 million botnet victims
 June 21: A spear phishing incident at the Office of the Secretary of Defense steals sensitive U.S. defense information, leading to significant changes in identity and message-source verification at OSD.

 August 11: United Nations website hacked by Indian Hacker Pankaj Kumar Singh.
November 14: Panda Burning Incense which is known by several other names, including Fujacks and Radoppan.T lead to the arrest of eight people in China. Panda Burning Incense was a parasitic virus that infected executable files on a PC. When infected, the icon of the executable file changes to an image of a panda holding three sticks of incense. The arrests were the first for virus writing in China.

2008
 January 17: Project Chanology; Anonymous attacks Scientology website servers around the world. Private documents are stolen from Scientology computers and distributed over the Internet.
 March 7: Around 20 Chinese hackers claim to have gained access to the world's most sensitive sites, including the Pentagon. They operated from an apartment on a Chinese Island.
 March 14: Trend Micro website successfully hacked by Turkish hacker Janizary (aka Utku).

2009
 April 4: Conficker worm infiltrated millions of PCs worldwide including many government-level top-security computer networks.

2010s

2010
 January 12: Operation Aurora Google publicly reveals that it has been on the receiving end of a "highly sophisticated and targeted attack on our corporate infrastructure originating from China that resulted in the theft of intellectual property from Google"
 June: Stuxnet The Stuxnet worm is found by VirusBlokAda. Stuxnet was unusual in that while it spread via Windows computers, its payload targeted just one specific model and type of SCADA systems. It slowly became clear that it was a cyber attack on Iran's nuclear facilities—with most experts believing that Israel was behind it—perhaps with US help.
 December 3: The first Malware Conference, MALCON took place in India. Founded by Rajshekhar Murthy, malware coders are invited to showcase their skills at this annual event supported by the Government of India. An advanced malware for Symbian OS is released by hacker A0drul3z.

2011
 The hacker group Lulz Security is formed.
 April 9: Bank of America website got hacked by a Turkish hacker named JeOPaRDY. An estimated 85,000 credit card numbers and accounts were reported to have been stolen due to the hack. Bank officials say no personal customer bank information is available on that web-page. Investigations are being conducted by the FBI to trace down the incriminated hacker.
 April 17: An "external intrusion" sends the PlayStation Network offline, and compromises personally identifying information (possibly including credit card details) of its 77 million accounts, in what is claimed to be one of the five largest data breaches ever.
 Computer hacker sl1nk releases information of his penetration in the servers of the Department of Defense (DoD), Pentagon, NASA, NSA, US Military, Department of the Navy, Space and Naval Warfare System Command and other UK/US government websites.
 September: Bangladeshi hacker TiGER-M@TE made a world record in defacement history by hacking 700,000 websites in a single shot.
 October 16: The YouTube channel of Sesame Street was hacked, streaming pornographic content for about 22 minutes.
 November 1: The main phone and Internet networks of the Palestinian territories sustained a hacker attack from multiple locations worldwide.
 November 7: The forums for Valve's Steam service were hacked. Redirects for a hacking website, Fkn0wned, appeared on the Steam users' forums, offering "hacking tutorials and tools, porn, free giveaways and much more."
 December 14: Five members of the Norwegian hacker group, Noria, were arrested, allegedly suspected for hacking into the email account of the militant extremist Anders Behring Breivik (who perpetrated the 2011 attacks in the country).

2012
 A hacker published over 400,000 credit cards online, and threatened Israel to release 1 million credit cards in the future. In response to that incident, an Israeli hacker published over 200 Albanian' credit cards online.
Gottfrid Svartholm Warg, the co-founder of Pirate Bay, was convicted in Denmark of hacking a mainframe computer, what was then Denmark's biggest hacking case.
January 7: "Team Appunity", a group of Norwegian hackers, were arrested for breaking into Norway's largest prostitution website then publishing the user database online.
February 3: Marriott was hacked by a New Age ideologist, Attila Nemeth who was resisting against the New World Order where he said that corporations are allegedly controlling the world. As a response Marriott reported him to the United States Secret Service.
February 8: Foxconn is hacked by a hacker group, "Swagg Security", releasing a massive amount of data including email and server logins, and even more alarming—bank account credentials of large companies like Apple and Microsoft. Swagg Security stages the attack just as a Foxconn protest ignites against terrible working conditions in southern China.
May 4: The websites of several Turkish representative offices of international IT-companies are defaced within the same day by F0RTYS3V3N (Turkish Hacker), including the websites of Google, Yandex, Microsoft, Gmail, MSN, Hotmail, PayPal.
May 24: WHMCS is hacked by UGNazi, they claim that the reason for this is because of the illegal sites that are using their software.
May 31: MyBB is hacked by newly founded hacker group, UGNazi, the website was defaced for about a day, they claim their reasoning for this was because they were upset that the forum board Hackforums.net uses their software.
June 5: The social networking website LinkedIn has been hacked and the passwords for nearly 6.5 million user accounts are stolen by cybercriminals. As a result, a United States grand jury indicted Nikulin and three unnamed co-conspirators on charges of aggravated identity theft and computer intrusion.
August 15: Saudi Aramco is crippled by a cyber warfare attack for months by malware called Shamoon. Considered the biggest hack in history in terms of cost and destructiveness. Carried out by an Iranian attacker group called Cutting Sword of Justice. Iranian hackers retaliated against Stuxnet by releasing Shamoon. The malware destroyed over 35,000 Saudi Aramco computers, affecting business operations for months.
December 17: Computer hacker sl1nk announced that he has hacked a total of 9 countries' SCADA systems. The proof includes 6 countries: France, Norway, Russia, Spain, Sweden and the United States.

2013
 The social networking website Tumblr is attacked by hackers. Consequently, 65,469,298 unique emails and passwords were leaked from Tumblr. The data breach's legitimacy is confirmed by computer security researcher Troy Hunt.
 August: Yahoo! data breaches occurred.  More than 3 billion users data are being leaked.

2014
 February 7: The bitcoin exchange Mt. Gox filed for bankruptcy after $460million was apparently stolen by hackers due to "weaknesses in [their] system" and another $27.4million went missing from its bank accounts.
 October: The White House computer system was hacked. It was said that the FBI, the Secret Service, and other U.S. intelligence agencies categorized the attacks "among the most sophisticated attacks ever launched against U.S. government systems."
 November 24: In response to the release of the film The Interview, the servers of Sony Pictures are hacked by a hacker group calling itself "Guardian of Peace".
 November 28: The website of the Philippine telecommunications company Globe Telecom was hacked in response to the poor internet service they are distributing.

2015
 June: the records of 21.5 million people, including social security numbers, dates of birth, addresses, fingerprints, and security clearance-related information, are stolen from the United States Office of Personnel Management (OPM). Most of the victims are employees of the United States government and unsuccessful applicants to it. The Wall Street Journal and The Washington Post report that government sources believe the hacker is the government of China.
July: The servers of extramarital affairs website Ashley Madison were breached.

2016
 February: The 2016 Bangladesh Bank heist attempted to steal US$951 million from a Bangladesh Bank, and succeeded in getting $101 million—although some of this was later recovered.
 July 22: WikiLeaks published the documents from the 2016 Democratic National Committee email leak.
 July 29: a group suspected coming from China launched hacker attacks on the website of Vietnam Airlines.
 August 13: The Shadow Brokers (TSB) started publishing several leaks containing hacking tools from the National Security Agency (NSA), including several zero-day exploits. Ongoing leaks until April 2017 (The Shadow Brokers)
 September: Hacker Ardit Ferizi is sentenced to 20 years in prison after being arrested for hacking U.S. servers and passing the leaked information to members of ISIL terrorist group back in 2015.
 October: The 2016 Dyn cyberattack is being conducted with a botnet consisting of IOTs infected with Mirai by the hacktivist groups SpainSquad, Anonymous, and New World Hackers, reportedly in retaliation for Ecuador's rescinding Internet access to WikiLeaks founder Julian Assange at their embassy in London, where he has been granted asylum.
Late 2016: Hackers steal international personal user data from the company Uber, including phone numbers, email addresses, and names, of 57 million people and 600,000 driver's license numbers of drivers for the company. Uber's GitHub account was accessed through Amazon's cloud-based service. Uber paid the hackers $100,000 for assurances the data was destroyed.
 December 2016: Yahoo! data breaches reported and affected more than 1 billion users.  The data leakage includes user names, email addresses, telephone numbers, encrypted or unencrypted security questions and answers, dates of birth, and hashed passwords

2017
 April: A hacker group calling itself "The Dark Overlord" posted unreleased episodes of Orange Is the New Black TV series online after failing to extort the online entertainment company Netflix.
 May: WannaCry ransomware attack started on Friday, May 12, 2017, and has been described as unprecedented in scale, infecting more than 230,000 computers in over 150 countries. A hacked unreleased Disney film is held for ransom, to be paid in Bitcoin.
 May: 25,000 digital photos and ID scans relating to patients of the Grozio Chirurgija cosmetic surgery clinic in Lithuania were obtained and published without consent by an unknown group demanding ransoms. Thousands of clients from more than 60 countries were affected. The breach brought attention to weaknesses in Lithuania's information security.
June: 2017 Petya cyberattack.
June: TRITON (TRISIS), a malware framework designed to reprogram Triconex safety instrumented systems (SIS) of industrial control systems (ICS), discovered in Saudi Arabian Petrochemical plant.
August: Hackers demand $7.5 million in Bitcoin to stop pre-releasing HBO shows and scripts, including Ballers, Room 104 and Game of Thrones.
 May–July 2017: The Equifax breach. 
 September 2017: Deloitte breach.
December: Mecklenburg County, North Carolina computer systems were hacked. They did not pay the ransom.

2018 
 March: Computer systems in the city of Atlanta, in the U.S. state of Georgia, are seized by hackers with ransomware. They did not pay the ransom, and two Iranians were indicted by the FBI on cyber crime charges for the breach.
 The town of Wasaga Beach in Ontario, Canada computer systems are seized by hackers with ransomware.
September: Facebook was hacked, exposing to hackers the personal information of an estimated 30 million Facebook users (initially estimated at 50 million) when the hackers "stole" the "access tokens" of 400,000 Facebook users. The information accessible to the hackers included users' email addresses, phone numbers, their lists of friends, Groups they are members of, users' search information, posts on their timelines, and names of recent Messenger conversations.
October: West Haven, Connecticut USA computer systems are seized by hackers with ransomware, they paid $2,000 in ransom.
November: 
The first U.S. indictment of individual people for ransomware attacks occurs. The U.S. Justice Department indicted two men Faramarz Shahi Savandi and Mohammad Mehdi Shah Mansouri who allegedly used the SamSam ransomware for extortion, netting them more than $6 million in ransom payments. The companies infected with the ransomware included Allscripts, Medstar Health, and Hollywood Presbyterian Medical Center. Altogether, the attacks caused victims to lose more than $30 million, in addition to the ransom payments.
Marriott disclosed that its Starwood Hotel brand had been subject to a security breach.

2019 
March: Jackson County computer systems in the U.S. state of Georgia are seized by hackers with ransomware, they paid $400,000 in ransom. The city of Albany in the U.S. state of New York experiences a ransomware cyber attack.
April: Computer systems in the city of Augusta, in the U.S. state of Maine, are seized by hackers using ransomware. The City of Greenville (North Carolina)'s computer systems are seized by hackers using ransomware known as RobbinHood. Imperial County, in the U.S. state of California, computer systems are seized by hackers using Ryuk ransomware.
 May: computer systems belonging to the City of Baltimore are seized by hackers using ransomware known as RobbinHood that encrypts files with a "file-locking" virus, as well as the tool EternalBlue.
June: The city of Riviera Beach, Florida paid roughly $600,000 ransom in Bitcoin to hackers who seized their computers using ransomware. Hackers stole 18 hours of unreleased music from the band Radiohead demanding $150,000 ransom. Radiohead released the music to the public anyway and did not pay the ransom.
November: The Anonymous hacktivist collective announced that they have hacked into four Chinese computer databases and donated those to data breach indexing/notification service vigilante.pw. The hack was conducted in order to support the 2019 Hong Kong protests, amidst the Hong Kong police's siege of the city's Polytechnic University. They also brought up a possible peace plan first proposed by a professor at Inha University in hopes of having the Korean reunification and the five key demands of the Hong Kong protest being fulfilled at once.

2020s

2020
 February: Anonymous hacked the United Nations website and created a page for Taiwan, a country which had not had a seat at the UN since 1971. The hacked page featured the Flag of Taiwan, the KMT emblem, a Taiwan Independence flag, the Anonymous logo, embedded YouTube videos such as the Taiwanese national anthem and the closing score for the 2019 film Avengers: Endgame titled "It's Been a Long, Long Time", and a caption. The hacked server belonged to the United Nations Department of Economic and Social Affairs.
 May: Anonymous declared a large hack on May 28, three days after the murder of George Floyd. An individual claiming to represent Anonymous stated that "We are Legion. We do not forgive. We do not forget. Expect us." in a now-deleted video. Anonymous addressed police brutality and said they "will be exposing [their] many crimes to the world". It was suspected that Anonymous were the cause for the downtime and public suspension of the Minneapolis Police Department website and its parent site, the website of the City of Minneapolis.
 May: Indian national Shubham Upadhyay posed as Superintendent of Police and, using social engineering, used a free caller identification app to call up the in-charge of the Kotwali police station, K. K. Gupta, in order to threaten him to get his phone repaired amidst the COVID-19 lockdown. The attempt was foiled.
 June: Anonymous claimed responsibility for stealing and leaking a trove of documents collectively nicknamed 'BlueLeaks'. The 269-gigabyte collection was published by a leak-focused activist group known as Distributed Denial of Secrets. Furthermore, the collective took down Atlanta Police Department's website via DDoS, and defaced websites such as a Filipino governmental webpage and that of Brookhaven National Labs. They expressed support for Julian Assange and press freedom, while briefly "taking a swing" against Facebook, Reddit and Wikipedia for having 'engaged in shady practices behind our prying eyes'. In the case of Reddit, they posted a link to a court document describing the possible involvement of a moderator of a large traffic subreddit (/r/news) in an online harassment-related case.
 June: The Buffalo, NY police department's website was supposedly hacked by Anonymous. While the website was up and running after a few minutes, Anonymous tweeted again on Twitter urging that it be taken down. A few minutes later, the Buffalo NY website was brought down again. They also hacked Chicago police radios to play N.W.A's "Fuck tha Police".
 June: Over 1,000 accounts on multiplayer online game Roblox were hacked to display that they supported U.S. President Donald Trump.
 July: The 2020 Twitter bitcoin scam occurred.
 July: User credentials of writing website Wattpad were stolen and leaked on a hacker forum. The database contained over 200 million records.
 August: A large number of subreddits were hacked to post materials endorsing Donald Trump. The affected subreddits included r/BlackPeopleTwitter, r/3amJokes, r/NFL, r/PhotoshopBattles. An entity with the name of "calvin goh and Melvern" had purportedly claimed responsibility for the massive defacement, and also made violent threats against a Chinese embassy.
 August: The US Air Force's Hack-A-Sat event was hosted at DEF CON's virtual conference where groups such as Poland Can Into Space, FluxRepeatRocket, AddVulcan, Samurai, Solar Wine, PFS, 15 Fitty Tree, and 1064CBread competed in order to control a satellite in space. The Poland Can Into Space team stood out for having successfully manipulated a satellite to take a picture of the Moon.
 August: The website of Belarusian company "BrestTorgTeknika" was defaced by a hacker nicknaming herself "Queen Elsa", in order to support the 2020–21 Belarusian protests. In it, the page hacker exclaimed "Get Iced Iced already" and "Free Belarus, revolution of our times" with the latter alluding to the famous slogan used by 2019 Hong Kong protests. The results of the hack were then announced on Reddit's /r/Belarus subreddit by a poster under the username "Socookre".
 August: Multiple DDoS attacks forced New Zealand's stock market to temporarily shut down.
 September: The first suspected death from a cyberattack was reported after cybercriminals hit a hospital in Düsseldorf, Germany with ransomware.
State security officials and American corporate security officers were concerned that these attacks might be a prelude to hacking of election infrastructure during the elections of the subsequent month, like similar incidents during the 2016 United States elections and other attacks; there was, however, no evidence that they performed attacks on election infrastructure in 2020.
 December: A supply chain attack targeting upstream dependencies from Texas IT service provider "SolarWinds" results in serious, wide-ranging security breaches at the U.S. Treasury and Commerce departments. White House officials did not immediately publicly identify a culprit; Reuters, citing sources "familiar with the investigation", pointed toward the Russian government. An official statement shared by Senate Finance Committee ranking member, Ron Wyden said: "Hackers broke into systems in the Departmental Offices division of Treasury, home to the department’s highest-ranking officials."
 December: A bomb threat posted from a Twitter account that was seemingly hacked by persons with the aliases of "Omnipotent" and "choonkeat",  against the Aeroflot Flight 102, a passenger flight with the plane tail number of VQ-BIL coming from Moscow to New York City. Due to that, a runway of New York's John F. Kennedy International Airport was temporarily closed and resulted in the delay of Aeroflot Flight 103, a return flight back to Moscow.
 December: The Anonymous group initiated 'Christmas gift' defacements against multiple Russian portals including a municipal website in Tomsk and that of a regional football club. Inside the defacements, they made multiple references such as Russian opposition activist Alexei Navalny, freedom protests in Thailand and Belarus, and opposition to the Chinese Communist Party. They also held a mock award based on an event on the game platform Roblox that was called "RB Battles" where YouTubers Tanqr and KreekCraft, the winner and the runner up of the actual game event, were compared to both Taiwan and New Zealand respectively due to the latter's reportedly stellar performance in fighting the COVID-19 pandemic.

2021
 January: Microsoft Exchange Server data breach
 February: Anonymous announced cyber-attacks of at least five Malaysian websites. As a result, eleven individuals were nabbed as suspects.
 February: Hackers including those with names of "张卫能 utoyo" and "full_discl0sure" hijacked an events website Aucklife in order to craft a phony bomb threat against the Chinese consulate in Auckland, New Zealand, and also a similar facility in Sydney, Australia. Their motive was a punitive response against China due to COVID-19. As a result, a physical search was conducted at the consulate by New Zealand's Police Specialist Search Group while Aucklife owner Hailey Newton had since regained her access to the website. Wellington-based cybersecurity consultant Adam Boileau remarked that the hack isn't 'highly technical'.
 February: The group "Myanmar Hackers" attacked several websites belonging to Myanmar government agencies such as the Central Bank of Myanmar and the military-run Tatmadaw True News Information Team. The group also targeted the Directorate of Investment and Company Administration, Trade Department, Customs Department, Ministry of Commerce, Myawady TV and state-owned broadcaster Myanmar Radio and Television and some private media outlets. A computer technician in Yangon found that the hacks were denial-of-service attacks, while the group's motive is to protest the 2021 Myanmar coup.
 April: Over 500 million Facebook users' personal info—including info on 32 million in the United States—was discovered posted on a hackers' website, though Facebook claimed that the information was from a 2019 hack, and that the company had already taken mitigation measures; however, the company declined to say whether it had notified the affected users of the breach.
 May: Operation of the U.S. Colonial Pipeline is interrupted by a ransomware cyber operation.
 May: On 21 May 2021 Air India was subjected to a cyberattack wherein the personal details of about 4.5 million customers around the world were compromised including passport, credit card details, birth dates, name and ticket information.
 July: On 22 July 2021 Saudi Aramco data were leaked by a third-party contractor and demanded $50 million ransom from Saudi Aramco. Saudi Aramco confirmed the incident after a hacker claimed on dark web that he had stolen 1 terabyte of data about location of oil refineries and employees data in a post that was posted on June 23.
 August: T-Mobile reported that data files with information from about 40 million former or prospective T-Mobile customers, including first and last names, date of birth, SSN, and driver's license/ID information, were compromised.
September and October: 2021 Epik data breach. Anonymous obtained and released over 400gigabytes of data from the domain registrar and web hosting company Epik. The data was shared in three releases between September 13 and October 4. The first release included domain purchase and transfer details, account credentials and logins, payment history, employee emails, and unidentified private keys. The hackers claimed they had obtained "a decade's worth of data", including all customer data and records for all domains ever hosted or registered through the company, and which included poorly encrypted passwords and other sensitive data stored in plaintext. The second release consisted of bootable disk images and API keys for third-party services used by Epik; the third contained additional disk images and an archive of data belonging to the Republican Party of Texas, who are an Epik customer.
October: On October 6, 2021, an anonymous 4chan reportedly hacked and leaked the source code of Twitch, as well as information on how much the streaming service paid almost 2.4 million streamers since August 2019. Source code from almost 6,000 GitHub repositories was leaked, and the 4chan user said it was "part one" of a much larger release.
 November and December: On November 24th, Chen Zhaojun of Alibaba's Cloud Security Team reported a zero-day vulnerability (later dubbed Log4Shell) involving the use of arbitrary code execution in the ubiquitous Java logging framework software Log4j. The report was privately disclosed to project developers of Log4j, a team at The Apache Software Foundation, on November 24. On December 8, Zhaojun contacted the developers again detailing how the vulnerability was being discussed in public security chat rooms, was already known by some security researchers, and pleaded that the team expedite the solution to the vulnerability in the official release version of Log4j. Early exploitations were noticed on Minecraft servers on December 9; however, forensic analysis indicates that Log4Shell may have been exploited as early as December 1 or 2nd. Due to the ubiquity of devices with the Log4j software (hundreds of millions) and the simplicity in executing the vulnerability, it is considered to be arguably one of the largest and most critical vulnerabilities ever. Yet, big names in security hacking helped in regaining control over server, like Graham Ivan Clark, and Elhamy A. Elsebaey.  A portion of the vulnerability was fixed in a patch distributed on December 6, three days before the vulnerability was publicly disclosed on December 9.

2022
 February: The German Chaos Computer Club has reported more than fifty data leaks. Government institutions and companies from various business sectors were affected. In total, the researchers had access to over 6.4 million personal data records as well as terabytes of log data and source code.
 March: The website of a local newspaper in Sumy, Ukraine was hacked by a person identifying themselves as "zehang陈". They claimed that they and other individuals "P_srim_asap", "Mrthanthomthebomber", "mister-handsomekai" and "RiansJohnson" had placed bombs at Chinese and Russian diplomatic facilities in Malaysia with the former containing a photo of Huanan Seafood Wholesale Market, Hong Kong's International Finance Centre and MTR Airport Station, and the headquarters office of American game company ROBLOX. Besides that, they claimed responsibility for the delivery of an envelope containing white powders against the Russian embassy in Canberra, Australia. As a result the area surrounding the embassy was briefly cordoned off.
 March: As a response to the 2022 Russian invasion of Ukraine, Anonymous performed many attacks against computer systems in Russia. Most notably, Anonymous committed a cyberattack against Roskomnadzor.
March: On 23 March 2022, hackers compromised the Ronin Network, stealing approximately US$620 million in Ether and USDC. A total of 173,600 Ether and 25.5 million USDC tokens were stolen in two transactions.  It took the company six days to notice the hack. The hack currently sits as the largest-ever breach in the cryptocurrency sector by dollar value. It further damaged the value of SLP. On 8 April 2022, Sky Mavis said it expected it would be able to recover some of the funds, but it would take several years. The company raised additional venture capital and reimbursed all users affected in the hack. On 14 April 2022, the FBI issued a statement that the Lazarus Group and APT38, which are North Korean state-sponsored hacker groups, were responsible for the theft. Accordingly, the US Treasury has sanctioned the cryptocurrency address. Some of the cryptocurrency has been laundered through a cryptocurrency tumbler known as "Tornado Cash".
 April: Anonymous hacked Russian companies Aerogas, Forest, and Petrovsky Fort. From there they leaked around 437,500 emails which they donated to non-profit whistleblower organization Distributed Denial of Secrets. Furthermore, they leaked 446 GB of data from Russian Ministry of Culture.
 April: On April 19, Gijón City Council (Spain) was attacked by the GERVASIA computer virus and suffered data hijacking.
 May: Network Battalion 65 (NB65), a hacktivist group affiliated with Anonymous, has reportedly hacked Russian payment processor Qiwi. A total of 10.5 terabytes of data including transaction records and customers' credit cards had been exfiltrated. They further infected Qiwi with ransomwares and threatened to release more customer records.
 May: During the Victory Day in Russia, anti-war messages were inserted into Russian TV schedules including that of Russia-1, Channel 1, and NTV-Plus. One of the messages were "On your hands is the blood of thousands of Ukrainians and their hundreds of murdered children. TV and the authorities are lying. No to war."
 June: A hacker on the Breach Forums claimed to have leaked more than 1 billion people's personal records from the Shanghai National Police Database.
 August: During the visit of Speaker of the United States House of Representatives Nancy Pelosi to Taiwan, the website of Taiwan's Office of the President website was affected by a distributed denial of service attack. Anonymous then hacked into a China Heilongjiang province's Society Scientific Community Federation website and a Chinese gasoline generator factory’s website.

See also
 List of cyberattacks
 List of data breaches

References

Further reading
 
 
 
 
 
 

Computer Security Hacker History
Computer security
Hacking (computer security)